Ripps Island was an island located in the Potomac River in the northwest quadrant of Washington, D.C., in the United States. It was located at the mouth of Tiber Creek, in the vicinity of today's Constitution Gardens.

External links

Former islands of the United States
Islands of the Potomac River
River islands of Washington, D.C.
Northwest (Washington, D.C.)